Peter Maloney (born 5 November 1950) is an Australian former cricketer. He played one first-class match for New South Wales in 1976/77.

See also
 List of New South Wales representative cricketers

References

External links
 

1950 births
Living people
Australian cricketers
New South Wales cricketers
People from the Northern Rivers
Cricketers from New South Wales